The 2020 Maryland Democratic presidential primary took place on June 2, 2020, after being rescheduled due to the COVID-19 pandemic, as one of eight delayed and regular primaries on the same day in the Democratic Party primaries for the 2020 presidential election. It was originally planned to take place on April 28, 2020, as one of several states in the "Acela primary". The Maryland primary was a closed primary, with the state awarding 120 delegates to the 2020 Democratic National Convention, of whom 96 were pledged delegates allocated on the basis of the primary results.

Former vice president and presumptive nominee Joe Biden won the primary with 83.7% of the vote, one of hist best results in the whole primary cycle and his best until then, earning all delegates and helping him to cross the necessary majority of 1,991 delegates and officially win the Democratic nomination three days later during the vote count. Senator Bernie Sanders, who had withdrawn from the presidential race in April but still competed for delegates, only reached less than 8%, his lowest result until then. The remaining 9% were separated between 12 other long withdrawn candidates and the "uncommitted" option.

Procedure
Maryland would have held its primary on April 28 as part of a regional cluster, the Acela primary, together with the five states of Connecticut, Delaware, New York, Pennsylvania and Rhode Island, but like Pennsylvania and Rhode Island Governor Larry Hogan postponed it to June 2, while the three other states selected different dates. On that day, they voted alongside one other delayed contest in Indiana and four regularly scheduled contests (District of Columbia, Montana, New Mexico and South Dakota).

Voting took place throughout the state from 7 a.m. until 8 p.m. In the closed primary, candidates had to meet a threshold of 15% at the congressional district or statewide level in order to be considered viable. The 96 pledged delegates to the 2020 Democratic National Convention were allocated proportionally on the basis of the primary results. Of these, between 7 and 9 were allocated to each of the state's 8 congressional districts and another 10 were allocated to party leaders and elected officials (PLEO delegates), in addition to 21 at-large delegates. Originally planned with 79 delegates, the final number included a 25% bonus of 17 additional delegates on the 52 district and 17 at-large delegates by the Democratic National Committee, 10% for the original April date, which belonged to Stage II on the primary timetable, and an additional 15% for the regional "Acela" cluster.

District-level national convention delegates were voted on by the voters during the presidential primary, with no need for an additional confirmation by partie bodies. If a presidential candidate listed fewer district delegate candidates than had to be allocated based on the results of the primary, then the additional delegates would be named by the Democratic state central committee, before voting on the 21 at-large and 10 pledged PLEO delegates for the Democratic National Convention. The committee would originally have met on May 23, 2020 with the replacement date for that meeting being unknown. The delegation also included 24 unpledged PLEO delegates: 14 members of the Democratic National Committee, 9 members of Congress (both senators and 7 representatives), and former DNC chair Joe Andrew.

Candidates
The following individuals qualified for the ballot in Maryland:

Running
Joe Biden
Withdrawn

Michael Bennet
Michael Bloomberg
Cory Booker
Pete Buttigieg
Julian Castro
Tulsi Gabbard
Amy Klobuchar
Deval Patrick
Bernie Sanders
Tom Steyer
Elizabeth Warren
Marianne Williamson
Andrew Yang

John Delaney had also qualified but had submitted an official withdrawal on February 3 so that he could be taken off the ballot. There was also an uncommited option.

Polling

Results

See also
2020 Maryland Republican presidential primary

Notes

References

External links
The Green Papers delegate allocation summary
Maryland Democratic Party delegate selection plan

Maryland Democratic
Democratic primary
2020
Maryland Democratic